Vasum crosseanum, common name ceramic vase or heavy whelk, is a species of medium to large sea snail, a marine gastropod mollusk in the family Turbinellidae.

Description
Vasum crosseanum has a large, thick and heavy pyriform shell that reaches a length of  95 mm and a maximum width of 65 mm.. The shell contains  eight whorls with a spiral sculpture of uneven, rough threads. There are five columellar plicae.

Distribution
This rare species occurs off Mauritius.

Habitat
This sea snail lives on lower eulittoral, rocky areas at depth of 10 to 40 m.

References

 Souverbie [S.-M.]. (1875). Description d'une espèce nouvelle appartenant au genre Turbinella. Journal de Conchyliologie. 23: 297-298.
 Souverbie, M., 1876. Descriptions d'espèces nouvelles. Journal de Conchyliologie 24: 382-383
 Verneau N. (2013). Un mollusque rarissime découvert à Mayotte. Xenophora. 143: 6.

External links
 R. Tucker Abbott - The family Vasidae in the Indo-Pacific; Indo-Paciflc Mollusca vol. 1

crosseanum
Gastropods described in 1875